The Fall River Pump House and Catchment Basin in Rocky Mountain National Park, Colorado, are utility structures which treat water for the Fall River Pass Museum and the Alpine Visitor Center.

Description
Built in 1938, the facility was designed by National Park Service landscape architects L. Fletcher and W.G. Hill in the National Park Service Rustic style then favored. The pump house is a simple stone-faced concrete building, built into the hillside.

The catchment basin captures a stream behind a small stone-faced concrete dam.

See also
Fall River Pass Ranger Station
National Register of Historic Places listings in Larimer County, Colorado

References

National Register of Historic Places in Rocky Mountain National Park
Buildings and structures in Larimer County, Colorado
Industrial buildings and structures on the National Register of Historic Places in Colorado
Water supply infrastructure on the National Register of Historic Places
Water supply pumping stations on the National Register of Historic Places
Water in Colorado
Infrastructure completed in 1938
National Park Service rustic in Colorado
Former pumping stations
National Register of Historic Places in Larimer County, Colorado
1938 establishments in Colorado